Malonogometni klub Split, previously known as MNK Split Brodosplit Inženjering and Fc Split Tommy, is a futsal club based in Split, Croatia.

Honours
Croatian League:
1996/97
2000/01
2001/02
2002/03
2003/04
2005/06
2010/11
2011/12

Croatian Futsal Cup:
2000/01
2001/02
2002/03
2004/05
2005/06
2010/11
2011/12
2013/14
2015/16

UEFA Club Competitions Record

UEFA Futsal Cup

Players
 Luka Pavlović
 Duje Vladović
 Vicko Radić
 Mario Taći
 Robert Vinko Pavičić
 Davor Milanko
 Ivan Bezmalonović
 Nikola Moro
 Marin Musinov

Notable former players 
 Nikola Tomičić
 Aljoša Staničić
 Alen Delpont
 Nikola Čizmić
 Dario Marinović
 Ivo Jukić
 Franco Jelovčić
 Alen Fetič
 Toni Kirevski
 Branko Laura 
 Nikola Pavić
 Genário Benício Peixoto
 Alen Marić 
 Alen Protega 
 Saša Subotić

Famous players
 Robert Jarni
 Nikola Tomičić
 Toni Kirevski

See also
Futsal in Croatia

External links
Official Website

Futsal clubs in Croatia
Football clubs in Split-Dalmatia County
MNK Split
Futsal clubs established in 1985
1985 establishments in Yugoslavia